William Pery may refer to:
 William Pery, 3rd Earl of Limerick, Irish peer and politician
 William Pery, 1st Baron Glentworth, Anglican bishop in Ireland
 William Pery, 4th Earl of Limerick, Irish peer and British Army officer